Robert Charles (1865–1900) was a Black American living in New Orleans who took part in a gunfight after being assaulted by a police officer, leading to the death of 4 police and 2 civilians, and the wounding of over 20 others. The event sparked a major race riot in 1900; known as the Robert Charles riots.

Killings

On Monday, July 23, 1900, Charles sat on the front steps of a house in New Orleans talking with a friend, while waiting to rendezvous with his girlfriend, Virginia Banks, who lived on the block. Three white police officers, Sergeant Jules C. Aucion, August T. Mora, and Joseph D. Cantrelle, investigated reports of "two suspicious looking negroes" sitting on a porch in a predominantly white neighborhood. They found Robert Charles and his roommate, 19-year-old Leonard Pierce, at the scene. The policemen questioned the two men, demanding to know what they "were doing and how long they had been there." One of the two men replied that they were "waiting for a friend." Charles stood up, which the police took as an aggressive move. Mora grabbed him and the two struggled. Mora hit Charles with his billy club. Mora and Charles pulled guns and exchanged shots. Reports vary on who drew first; both men received non-lethal gunshot wounds to the legs. Charles fled to his residence, leaving a trail of blood.

At Charles' residence, two officers, Officer Lamb and Captain Day, arrived and attempted to arrest Charles, but he brandished a rifle and shot and killed them both. Charles then fled on foot and the police initiated a manhunt.

On Tuesday July 24th, following the initiation of a manhunt, several New Orleans newspapers, especially the Times-Democrat, blamed the black community for Charles' crimes. Outraged white residents gathered in armed mobs and began roaming the streets, ostensibly searching for the fugitive Charles. In the following days, several race riots occurred as the armed white mobs confronted and attacked black residents. On the night of the July 25, white mobs killed three blacks and wounded six more so severely that they had to be hospitalized. Five whites were also hospitalized, and more than 50 people suffered lesser injuries.

Charles had taken refuge at 1208 Saratoga Street, where he remained safe from the police until Friday, July 27. Upon receiving a tip about the whereabouts of Charles from an informant, police searched the house. As the officers neared Charles' hiding place beneath the stairs, Charles opened fire, killing two of the officers [Sgt Gabe Porteus and Corporal John Lally]. Other officers, upon hearing the gunshots, quickly brought in reinforcements to both surround Charles and to protect the black residents from white mob violence. Historian William Ivy Hair described the scene:

Throughout the day, the police fired on the house, where Charles returned fire from the second-story windows. By 5pm, Charles had killed or fatally wounded five law officers, and wounded nineteen other persons. Yet more rioters continued to arrive. Under constant fire, and with no chance of entry without being shot, the rioters decided to light the house on fire to get him to leave his cover. While continuing to shoot, Charles attempted to flee the house, but on opening the door he was instantly shot by a special policeman and afterwards riddled with the bullets of the armed white mob. The mob then mutilated Charles' body.

Reception

Following his death, journalist Ida Wells-Barnett lauded Charles' actions. In her study on lynchings, she wrote: "[Charles] would have died had not he raised his hand to resent unprovoked assault and unlawful arrest that fateful Monday night. That made him an outlaw, and being a man of courage he decided to die with his face to the foe. The white people of this country may charge that he was a desperado, but to the people of his own race Robert Charles will always be regarded as the 'Hero of New Orleans.'"

See also
 Robert Charles riots
 Ida B. Wells
 Mark Essex
 List of rampage killers in the United States

References

Further reading

 Mob Rule in New Orleans: Robert Charles and His Fight to Death. by Ida B. Wells-Barnett (1900). 
 Carnival of Fury: Robert Charles and the New Orleans Race Riot of 1900. By William Ivy Hair. Baton Rouge: Louisiana State Press,1976.
 America and its People, Volume 2 From 1865 - 1988. Page 599 "Rise Brothers!": The Black Response to Jim Crow; by James Kirby Martin, Randy Roberts, Steven Mintz, Linda O. McMurry, James H. Jones, Publisher :  Scott, Foresmans and Company, 

1865 births
1900 deaths
African-American people
People from New Orleans
People in 19th-century Louisiana
Deaths by firearm in Louisiana